M(US)IC (meant to be pronounced "Us in Music") was released by Damiera in 2006 off of their indie record label, Tamerlane Records. It was re-released on Equal Vision Records January 23, 2007. This is the band's first full-length album.  The album was released on vinyl by Vega Vinyl on May 14, 2009.

Reception

Track listing
 "Immure"  – 3:16
 "Lessons"  – 3:38
 "M(US)IC"  – 3:22
 "Via Invested"  – 3:13
 "I AM Pulse"  – 3:09
 "Ember Eason"  – 3:39
 "Departures"  – 1:59
 "Flora: Yield"  – 3:52
 "Broken Hands"  – 3:27
 "Obsessions"  – 3:00

Recording
David Raymond - Vocals/Guitar
Mark Henry - Vocals/Bass
Rock Whittington - Guitar
Bradley McRae - Drums
Production - Jayson Dezuzio

2007 albums
Damiera albums
Equal Vision Records albums